Robert Hamilton Butts (August 4, 1871 in Port Morien, Nova Scotia, Canada – November 29, 1943) was a politician, barrister and lawyer. He was elected to the House of Commons of Canada as a member of the Unionist Party in the 1917 election to represent the riding of Cape Breton South and Richmond. He was defeated in the 1923 by-election for the riding of North Cape Breton and Victoria. Butts was also a Member of the Nova Scotia House of Assembly (1911–1917 and 1928–1933) representing the electoral district of Cape Breton County in two terms as a member of the Nova Scotia Conservative Party. He also served in the Legislative Council of Nova Scotia (1927–1928).

External links

1871 births
1943 deaths
Conservative Party of Canada (1867–1942) MPs
Members of the House of Commons of Canada from Nova Scotia
Progressive Conservative Association of Nova Scotia MLAs
Unionist Party (Canada) MPs
Conservative Party of Nova Scotia MLCs